Acantholycosa sayanensis is a species of wolf spiders found only in the Western Sayan Mountains in Russia.

This dark coloured spider with rather indistinct markings is 8.5 mm in length. It can only be separated from its closest congeners by details of the genitalia.

References

Lycosidae
Spiders described in 2003
Spiders of Russia